Whatever Turns You On is the second and last studio album by blues rock power trio/supergroup West, Bruce and Laing.

The album features a black-and-white comic strip on its front and back covers depicting the alleged "turn-ons" of the band's members - Leslie West's is food, Jack Bruce's alcohol, and Corky Laing's sex - as pursued by various avatars representing each of the three.  The album's front cover drawing shows the three band members, each pictured with their alter-egos.

Although not the hit that West, Bruce and Laing's debut 1972 album Why Dontcha was, Whatever Turns You On was a moderate success, reaching #87 on the Billboard U.S. album chart.

Track listing
All songs written by Leslie West, Jack Bruce and Corky Laing, except as noted.

Side one
"Backfire" (Bruce, Pete Brown, West, Laing) – 2:57
"Token" – 5:18
"Sifting Sand" – 3:07
"November Song" (Bruce, Brown, West, Laing) – 5:55

Side two
"Rock 'n' Roll Machine" – 3:53
"Scotch Crotch" (Bruce, Brown, West, Laing) – 3:17
"Slow Blues" – 5:08
"Dirty Shoes" – 2:23
"Like a Plate" (Bruce, Brown, West, Laing) – 4:37 (listed incorrectly as 3:07 on label)

Personnel
West, Bruce and Laing
 Leslie West – guitar, lead vocals (1-3, 5, 7, 8)
 Jack Bruce – bass, lead vocals (2-4, 6–9), backing vocals, piano, harmonium, organ
 Corky Laing – drums, percussion
Technical
Pacific Eye & Ear - album design
Joe Petagno - cover illustration

References

External links 
 Answers.com [Dead Link]
 The Album Art Gallery at Tralfaz.com
 West, Bruce & Laing - Whatever Turns You On (1973) album releases & credits at Discogs.com

1973 albums
West, Bruce and Laing albums
Columbia Records albums
Albums produced by Andy Johns